Young Israel of Flatbush is a historic synagogue at 1012 Avenue I in Midwood, Brooklyn, New York, New York.  It was built between 1925 and 1929 and is a three-story Moorish-inspired style building faced in polychromatic patterned brick.  It features horseshoe arches, minarets, and polychromatic tiles.

It was listed on the National Register of Historic Places in 2010.

History
This synagogue was one of the earliest, and for a long time one of the largest, branches of the National Council of Young Israel, a movement that requires all branches to have a rabbi. This requirement was not strictly enforced, at the time; Rabbi Solomon Sharfman
was their first rabbi.

Rabbi Sharfman
Rabbi Sharfman served as the Rabbi "from 1938 until his retirement in 1984."

Rabbi Auman
Rabbi Kenneth Auman is the current sprititual leader of the congregation.

References

External links

Young Israel of Flatbush website

National Council of Young Israel
Synagogues in Brooklyn
Flatbush, Brooklyn
Properties of religious function on the National Register of Historic Places in Brooklyn
Synagogues on the National Register of Historic Places in New York City
Synagogues completed in 1929
Moorish Revival architecture in New York City
Moorish Revival synagogues